Lieutenant Colonel Luis Francisco Pinto Parra Air Base  is a Colombian military base assigned to the Colombian Air Force (Fuerza Aérea Colombiana or FAC) Combat Air Command No. 4 (Comando Aéreo de Combate No. 4 or CACOM 4). It is in Melgar, a municipality in the Department of Tolima in Colombia, and is named in honor of Lieutenant Colonel Luis Francisco Pinto Parra.

Facilities 
It has two runways: 05/23, with an asphalt surface ; and 04/22 with a concrete surface .

See also
Transport in Colombia
List of airports in Colombia

References

Colombian Air Force bases
Buildings and structures in Tolima Department